Jacquelyn M. "Jacqui" Mitchell (born 1936) is an American bridge player from New York City and was the wife of Victor Mitchell who, like her, played in international events. According to Alan Truscott, writing in The New York Times in early 1987, in September 1986 she became the World Bridge Federation (WBF) highest-ranked woman player. She has won five world titles, four of them when partnering Gail Moss.

Career 
Mitchell was inducted into the ACBL Hall of Fame in 2003. At the time she was a busy professional teacher as well as player.

In 1981–2 and 1983, she took part in Grand Slam, two televised matches between teams representing the US and Britain, arranged by the BBC. The 1983 match was featured in a book that described her thus:Jackie [sic] Mitchell... is as utterly self disciplined at the table as she is away from it... She passes much of her time at the table doing embroidery as though determined to remain detached, but those who trifle with her do so at their peril. If her bidding sometimes appears orthodox, or a little too conservative, her card play and defence are of the very highest quality.

Bridge accomplishments

Honors
 ACBL Hall of Fame, 2003

Wins
 World Championships
 Venice Cup (2) 1976, 1978 
 World Olympiad Women’s Teams (2) 1980, 1984 
 World Women Pairs Championship (1) 1986 
 North American Bridge Championships (15)
 Whitehead Women's Pairs (5) 1971, 1975, 1977, 1984, 2004 
 Machlin Women's Swiss Teams (2) 1983, 1991 
 Wagar Women's Knockout Teams (7) 1965, 1970, 1974, 1975, 1976, 1983, 1987 
 Sternberg Women's Board-a-Match Teams (1) 1990

Runners-up
 World Mixed Pairs Championship (1) 1974
 North American Bridge Championships
 Whitehead Women's Pairs (2) 1970, 1974 
 Women's Pairs (1958-62) (1) 1962 
 Machlin Women's Swiss Teams (2) 1985, 2001 
 Wagar Women's Knockout Teams (3) 1973, 1982, 1991 
 Sternberg Women's Board-a-Match Teams (2) 1986, 1995 
 Chicago Mixed Board-a-Match (2) 1989, 1996

References

External links
 
 

1936 births
American contract bridge players
Venice Cup players
Sportspeople from New York City
Living people
Place of birth missing (living people)
Date of birth missing (living people)